Shishaldin Volcano, or Mount Shishaldin, is a moderately active volcano on Unimak Island in the Aleutian Islands chain of Alaska in the United States. It is the highest mountain peak of the Aleutian Islands. The volcano's topographic contour lines are nearly perfect circles above . The lower north and south slopes are somewhat steeper than the lower eastern and western slopes. The volcano is the westernmost of three large stratovolcanoes along an east–west line in the eastern half of Unimak Island.

The upper  is almost entirely covered by glacial snow and ice. It is flanked to the northwest by 24 monogenetic parasitic cones, an area blanketed by massive lava flows. The Shishaldin cone is less than 10,000 years old and is constructed on a glacially eroded remnant of an ancestral somma and shield. Remnants of the older ancestral volcano are exposed on the west and northeast sides at  elevation. The Shishaldin edifice contains about 300 cubic kilometers (72 cubic miles) of material.

In 1967, Shishaldin Volcano was designated as a National Natural Landmark by the National Park Service.

Name
The Aleuts named the volcano Sisquk or Sisagux,  meaning "mountain which points the way when I am lost." The spelling Shishaldin comes from the Russian version, Шишалдина, of the Aleut name.

Activity
This volcano has had many recorded eruptions during the 19th and 20th centuries, and a couple of reports of volcanic activity in the area during the 18th century may have referred to Shishaldin as well.  Therefore, the volcano's entire recorded history is spotted with reports of activity. AVO has 24 confirmed eruptions at Shishaldin, making it the volcano with the third most confirmed eruptions (after Akutan and Pavlof). However, Shishaldin has the most eruptions (this means confirmed and possible eruptions) in Alaska, but half of the eruptions are unconfirmed. Recent, well-documented eruptions were in 1995–96 and 1999. Since the 1999 eruption, it has maintained seismic activity, typically having very low-magnitude volcanic earthquakes (most are below magnitude 1) every 1–2 minutes. During this period of non-eruptive seismic activity, it has been puffing steam, with puffs also occurring about every 1–2 minutes. There were reports in 2004 of small quantities of ash being emitted with the steam.

A new period of activity started in July 2019 with incandescence observed in the summit crater during a time of increased seismic activity. On July 23, an active lava lake and minor spattering within the summit crater was observed. A new lava effusion event began on October 13 advancing over the next several weeks. The summit cone partially collapsed on November 25, producing a pyroclastic flow down the northwest side of the volcano and a new lava flow. During late December, eruptive activity continued with lava flows and low-level explosive activity at the summit. Another large ash cloud was emitted on January 19, 2020. The lava flows emitted during the eruptive events have cut deep channels in the snow and ice mantle of the volcano's north slope.

The Alaska Volcano Observatory monitors the volcano for more hazardous activity with seismometers and satellite images. Due to the remote location of the volcano, visual observations are rare.

Climbing
The first recorded ascent of Shishaldin was in 1932, by G. Peterson and two companions. Given the straightforward nature of the climbing (Alaska Grade 1, snow up to 40 degree slope), it is possible that an earlier ascent occurred, either by native Aleuts, Russians, or other visitors. Shishaldin is a popular ski descent ( vertical) for local climbers (of whom there are few). Due to its remoteness, Shishaldin is not often climbed by outsiders.

Gallery

See also

List of mountain peaks of North America
List of mountain peaks of the United States
List of mountain peaks of Alaska
List of Ultras of the United States
List of volcanoes in the United States

Further reading
 Finch, Ruy Herbert, 1934, "Shishaldin Volcano: Proceedings of the Fifth Pacific Science Conference, Canada", Proceedings - Pacific Science Conference v. 3, pp. 2369–2376
 Fournelle, John Harold, 1988, The geology and petrology of Shishaldin Volcano, Unimak Island, Aleutian Arc, Alaska, Ph.D. thesis Johns Hopkins University

References

External links

 
 
 Volcanoes of the Alaska Peninsula and Aleutian Islands-Selected Photographs
 Alaska Volcano Observatory (Shishaldin webcam)
 Michael Wood and Colby Coombs, Alaska: a climbing guide, The Mountaineers, 2001.

Mountains of Aleutians East Borough, Alaska
Active volcanoes
Stratovolcanoes of the United States
Mountains of Alaska
Volcanoes of Alaska
National Natural Landmarks in Alaska
Aleutian Range
Shishaldin
Holocene stratovolcanoes